Ferry Point is a cape on the San Francisco Bay in western Richmond, California, United States.

History
Ferry Point once served as the western terminus of the Atchison, Topeka and Santa Fe Railway, who constructed the pier in 1900 to facilitate ferry docking to transfer passengers and freight to other locations around the San Francisco Bay. Santa Fe trains began connecting with SP ferries at the Oakland Mole on April 23, 1933, replacing the Point Richmond passenger ferries. Ferry Point continued to be used for freight ferries, as well as troop ferries during World War II. The Port of Richmond gradually replaced Ferry Point, as the port could handle larger freighters. Freight ferries stopped using Ferry Point in 1975, making it the longest-lived of the transcontinental railroad wharves on the bay.
 The East Bay Regional Park District acquired the railroad right of way in 1991 and the land was incorporated into the Miller/Knox Regional Shoreline.

Ferry Point was initially named Point Richmond, but the area adopted a new descriptor after the nearby neighborhood became more associated with that moniker.

References

Geography of Richmond, California
Ferry terminals in the San Francisco Bay Area
Former Atchison, Topeka and Santa Fe Railway stations in California